Ommerstein Castle is a castle in the village of Rotem in the municipality of Dilsen-Stokkem, province of Limburg, Belgium.

The history of the castle goes back to the 13th century, but most of the present Neo-classical building dates from the 18th century, although the donjon survives from earlier.

The surrounding park is distinguished by its possession of a number of giant sequoias and cedars of Lebanon, including one believed to be the thickest in Belgium. There are also several ponds round the castle.

Notes

See also
List of castles in Belgium

Castles in Belgium
Castles in Limburg (Belgium)